The 1972–73 Pittsburgh Penguins season was the franchise's sixth season in the National Hockey League.

Offseason

Regular season

Final standings

Schedule and results

|- style="background:#cfc;"
| 1 || October 7 || Los Angeles || 2–4 || Pittsburgh ||  || 11,105 || 1–0–0 || 2
|- style="background:#cfc;"
| 2 || October 11 || Pittsburgh || 5–2 || St. Louis ||  || 17,853 || 2–0–0 || 4
|- style="background:#cfc;"
| 3 || October 14 || California || 2–5 || Pittsburgh ||  || 12,201 || 3–0–0 || 6
|- style="background:#fcf;"
| 4 || October 15 || Pittsburgh || 4–8 || Boston ||  || 15,003 || 3–1–0 || 6
|- style="background:#cfc;"
| 5 || October 17 || Pittsburgh || 5–0 || NY Islanders ||  || 8,175 || 4–1–0 || 8
|- style="background:#fcf;"
| 6 || October 18 || Pittsburgh || 3–4 || Toronto ||  || 16,248 || 4–2–0 || 8
|- style="background:#fcf;"
| 7 || October 21 || Boston || 4–2 || Pittsburgh ||  || 12,761 || 4–3–0 || 8
|- style="background:#cfc;"
| 8 || October 24 || Pittsburgh || 4–0 || Vancouver ||  || 15,570 || 5–3–0 || 10
|- style="background:#fcf;"
| 9 || October 27 || Pittsburgh || 3–6 || California ||  || 3,298 || 5–4–0 || 10
|- style="background:#fcf;"
| 10 || October 28 || Pittsburgh || 2–5 || Los Angeles ||  || 9,181 || 5–5–0 || 10
|-

|- style="background:#fcf;"
| 11 || November 1 || Montreal || 7–1 || Pittsburgh ||  || 10,472 || 5–6–0 || 10
|- style="background:#fcf;"
| 12 || November 2 || Pittsburgh || 2–4 || Philadelphia ||  || 13,511 || 5–7–0 || 10
|- style="background:#cfc;"
| 13 || November 4 || NY Rangers || 4–6 || Pittsburgh ||  || 12,255 || 6–7–0 || 12
|- style="background:#ffc;"
| 14 || November 5 || Pittsburgh || 1–1 || Detroit ||  || 14,041 || 6–7–1 || 13
|- style="background:#cfc;"
| 15 || November 8 || Philadelphia || 2–5 || Pittsburgh ||  || 7,449 || 7–7–1 || 15
|- style="background:#fcf;"
| 16 || November 11 || Vancouver || 4–3 || Pittsburgh ||  || 11,896 || 7–8–1 || 15
|- style="background:#fcf;"
| 17 || November 12 || Pittsburgh || 0–1 || Buffalo ||  || 15,668 || 7–9–1 || 15
|- style="background:#cfc;"
| 18 || November 15 || Minnesota || 1–7 || Pittsburgh ||  || 8,649 || 8–9–1 || 17
|- style="background:#cfc;"
| 19 || November 18 || Atlanta || 1–6 || Pittsburgh ||  || 10,959 || 9–9–1 || 19
|- style="background:#cfc;"
| 20 || November 19 || Pittsburgh || 5–3 || NY Rangers ||  || 17,500 || 10–9–1 || 21
|- style="background:#cfc;"
| 21 || November 22 || St. Louis || 4–10 || Pittsburgh ||  || 12,405 || 11–9–1 || 23
|- style="background:#ffc;"
| 22 || November 25 || NY Islanders || 2–2 || Pittsburgh ||  || 12,319 || 11–9–2 || 24
|- style="background:#fcf;"
| 23 || November 26 || Pittsburgh || 2–6 || Atlanta ||  || 9,041 || 11–10–2 || 24
|- style="background:#cfc;"
| 24 || November 29 || Toronto || 4–7 || Pittsburgh ||  || 9,971 || 12–10–2 || 26
|-

|- style="background:#cfc;"
| 25 || December 2 || Chicago || 2–3 || Pittsburgh ||  || 12,459 || 13–10–2 || 28
|- style="background:#fcf;"
| 26 || December 3 || Pittsburgh || 2–4 || Chicago ||  ||  || 13–11–2 || 28
|- style="background:#ffc;"
| 27 || December 6 || Pittsburgh || 4–4 || California ||  || 2,062 || 13–11–3 || 29
|- style="background:#fcf;"
| 28 || December 9 || Pittsburgh || 1–3 || Los Angeles ||  || 9,687 || 13–12–3 || 29
|- style="background:#cfc;"
| 29 || December 13 || NY Islanders || 1–9 || Pittsburgh ||  || 7,866 || 14–12–3 || 31
|- style="background:#cfc;"
| 30 || December 16 || Atlanta || 3–5 || Pittsburgh ||  || 11,095 || 15–12–3 || 33
|- style="background:#fcf;"
| 31 || December 17 || Pittsburgh || 1–9 || NY Rangers ||  || 17,500 || 15–13–3 || 33
|- style="background:#fcf;"
| 32 || December 19 || Boston || 3–2 || Pittsburgh ||  || 10,419 || 15–14–3 || 33
|- style="background:#fcf;"
| 33 || December 23 || Pittsburgh || 3–6 || Montreal ||  || 16,132 || 15–15–3 || 33
|- style="background:#ffc;"
| 34 || December 26 || Pittsburgh || 1–1 || Detroit ||  || 14,427 || 15–15–4 || 34
|- style="background:#ffc;"
| 35 || December 27 || Pittsburgh || 3–3 || Toronto ||  || 16,488 || 15–15–5 || 35
|- style="background:#fcf;"
| 36 || December 29 || Toronto || 4–0 || Pittsburgh ||  || 11,336 || 15–16–5 || 35
|- style="background:#ffc;"
| 37 || December 30 || Detroit || 2–2 || Pittsburgh ||  || 11,621 || 15–16–6 || 36
|-

|- style="background:#fcf;"
| 38 || January 2 || Pittsburgh || 4–5 || St. Louis ||  || 18,161 || 15–17–6 || 36
|- style="background:#cfc;"
| 39 || January 3 || Pittsburgh || 5–3 || Chicago ||  ||  || 16–17–6 || 38
|- style="background:#cfc;"
| 40 || January 6 || Vancouver || 2–4 || Pittsburgh ||  || 13,100 || 17–17–6 || 40
|- style="background:#fcf;"
| 41 || January 7 || Pittsburgh || 0–3 || NY Rangers ||  || 17,500 || 17–18–6 || 40
|- style="background:#fcf;"
| 42 || January 10 || Detroit || 2–1 || Pittsburgh ||  || 9,906 || 17–19–6 || 40
|- style="background:#cfc;"
| 43 || January 13 || Los Angeles || 1–3 || Pittsburgh ||  || 11,506 || 18–19–6 || 42
|- style="background:#fcf;"
| 44 || January 14 || Pittsburgh || 2–3 || Detroit ||  || 12,755 || 18–20–6 || 42
|- style="background:#fcf;"
| 45 || January 17 || Pittsburgh || 4–6 || Montreal ||  || 16,016 || 18–21–6 || 42
|- style="background:#fcf;"
| 46 || January 18 || Montreal || 5–2 || Pittsburgh ||  || 10,388 || 18–22–6 || 42
|- style="background:#cfc;"
| 47 || January 20 || Boston || 0–3 || Pittsburgh ||  || 13,100 || 19–22–6 || 44
|- style="background:#fcf;"
| 48 || January 21 || Pittsburgh || 3–9 || Chicago ||  ||  || 19–23–6 || 44
|- style="background:#cfc;"
| 49 || January 24 || Toronto || 2–5 || Pittsburgh ||  || 10,809 || 20–23–6 || 46
|- style="background:#fcf;"
| 50 || January 25 || Pittsburgh || 3–6 || Philadelphia ||  || 16,600 || 20–24–6 || 46
|- style="background:#fcf;"
| 51 || January 27 || Philadelphia || 5–3 || Pittsburgh ||  || 13,100 || 20–25–6 || 46
|- style="background:#cfc;"
| 52 || January 31 || Los Angeles || 1–4 || Pittsburgh ||  || 9,048 || 21–25–6 || 48
|-

|- style="background:#cfc;"
| 53 || February 3 || Minnesota || 1–2 || Pittsburgh ||  || 11,878 || 22–25–6 || 50
|- style="background:#fcf;"
| 54 || February 4 || Pittsburgh || 3–4 || Minnesota ||  || 15,070 || 22–26–6 || 50
|- style="background:#fcf;"
| 55 || February 7 || Pittsburgh || 2–5 || Montreal ||  || 16,028 || 22–27–6 || 50
|- style="background:#fcf;"
| 56 || February 10 || Pittsburgh || 3–6 || Boston ||  || 15,003 || 22–28–6 || 50
|- style="background:#cfc;"
| 57 || February 14 || Vancouver || 2–6 || Pittsburgh ||  || 8,758 || 23–28–6 || 52
|- style="background:#ffc;"
| 58 || February 17 || Buffalo || 3–3 || Pittsburgh ||  || 13,100 || 23–28–7 || 53
|- style="background:#fcf;"
| 59 || February 18 || Pittsburgh || 1–4 || Buffalo ||  || 15,660 || 23–29–7 || 53
|- style="background:#cfc;"
| 60 || February 20 || Pittsburgh || 4–0 || NY Islanders ||  || 13,327 || 24–29–7 || 55
|- style="background:#cfc;"
| 61 || February 22 || NY Islanders || 1–2 || Pittsburgh ||  || 9,200 || 25–29–7 || 57
|- style="background:#cfc;"
| 62 || February 24 || Chicago || 0–2 || Pittsburgh ||  || 13,100 || 26–29–7 || 59
|- style="background:#fcf;"
| 63 || February 25 || Pittsburgh || 1–2 || Buffalo ||  || 15,668 || 26–30–7 || 59
|- style="background:#cfc;"
| 64 || February 28 || St. Louis || 2–4 || Pittsburgh ||  || 13,100 || 27–30–7 || 61
|-

|- style="background:#fcf;"
| 65 || March 3 || California || 2–1 || Pittsburgh ||  || 11,688 || 27–31–7 || 61
|- style="background:#fcf;"
| 66 || March 4 || Minnesota || 5–2 || Pittsburgh ||  || 12,624 || 27–32–7 || 61
|- style="background:#fcf;"
| 67 || March 7 || Pittsburgh || 4–10 || Minnesota ||  || 15,273 || 27–33–7 || 61
|- style="background:#fcf;"
| 68 || March 10 || NY Rangers || 5–4 || Pittsburgh ||  || 13,100 || 27–34–7 || 61
|- style="background:#fcf;"
| 69 || March 11 || Pittsburgh || 2–3 || Philadelphia ||  || 16,600 || 27–35–7 || 61
|- style="background:#cfc;"
| 70 || March 14 || Pittsburgh || 3–2 || Los Angeles ||  || 8,007 || 28–35–7 || 63
|- style="background:#ffc;"
| 71 || March 16 || Pittsburgh || 5–5 || California ||  || 5,180 || 28–35–8 || 64
|- style="background:#fcf;"
| 72 || March 17 || Pittsburgh || 1–6 || Vancouver ||  || 15,570 || 28–36–8 || 64
|- style="background:#cfc;"
| 73 || March 21 || California || 2–5 || Pittsburgh ||  || 8,169 || 29–36–8 || 66
|- style="background:#ffc;"
| 74 || March 24 || Buffalo || 4–4 || Pittsburgh ||  || 12,945 || 29–36–9 || 67
|- style="background:#cfc;"
| 75 || March 25 || Pittsburgh || 4–2 || Atlanta ||  || 13,200 || 30–36–9 || 69
|- style="background:#cfc;"
| 76 || March 28 || Atlanta || 3–6 || Pittsburgh ||  || 10,081 || 31–36–9 || 71
|- style="background:#fcf;"
| 77 || March 31 || Pittsburgh || 2–7 || St. Louis ||  || 20,009 || 31–37–9 || 71
|-

|- style="background:#cfc;"
| 78 || April 1 || Philadelphia || 4–5 || Pittsburgh ||  || 11,253 || 32–37–9 || 73
|-

|- style="text-align:center;"
| Legend:       = Win       = Loss       = Tie

Playoffs
The Penguins failed to make the 1973 playoffs.

Player statistics
Skaters

Goaltenders

†Denotes player spent time with another team before joining the Penguins.  Stats reflect time with the Penguins only.
‡Denotes player was traded mid-season.  Stats reflect time with the Penguins only.

Awards and records
 Jean Pronovost became the first player to score 100 goals for the Penguins. He did so in a 3–3 tie against Buffalo on February 17.
 Syl Apps Jr. became the first player to record 50 assists in a season for the Penguins. He did so in a 5–2 win over California on March 21.
 Syl Apps Jr. established a new franchise record for points in a season with 85, besting the previous high of 59 held by both himself and Andy Bathgate.
 Ken Schinkel established a career franchise record for games (371), assists (143) and points (236). He had led in two categories since 1969 and bested the previous high in games set by Val Fonteyne in 1972 (349).
 Darryl Edestrand established a new franchise record for goals (15) and points (39) in a season by a defenseman. He topped the previous high of 10 goals (held by himself) and 33 points (held by Noel Price, Bob Woytowich, Duane Rupp and himself).
 Lowell MacDonald established a new franchise record for highest plus-minus in a season (+36). He broke the previous high of +18 set by Syl Apps Jr. in 1972.
 Duane Rupp became the first Penguins defenseman to score 100 points. His final total of 104 bested the previous total of 93 held by Bob Woytowich

Transactions
The Penguins were involved in the following transactions during the 1972–73 season:

Trades

Additions and subtractions

Draft picks

Pittsburgh Penguins' picks at the 1972 NHL Entry Draft. 

Draft notes 
 The Pittsburgh Penguins' first-round pick went to the Minnesota North Stars as the result of a June 10, 1968, trade that sent Bob Woytowich to the Penguins in exchange for this pick.
 The St. Louis Blues' second-round pick (originally from the Montreal Canadiens) went to the Pittsburgh Penguins as a result of a June 6, 1969, trade that sent Lou Angotti and a 1971 first-round pick to the Blues in exchange for Ron Schock, Craig Cameron and this pick.

References

 Player stats at Hockey Database
 Game log on NHL Database
 

Pittsburgh Penguins seasons
Pittsburgh
Pittsburgh
Pitts
Pitts